SK Klatovy 1898 is a Czech football club located in Klatovy in the Plzeň Region. It currently plays in the Czech Fourth Division. The club has taken part in the Czech Cup numerous times, reaching the third round of the tournament in 2006–07 and 2015–16.

References

External links
  

Football clubs in the Czech Republic
Klatovy District
Association football clubs established in 1898
1898 establishments in Austria-Hungary